Cuts for Luck and Scars for Freedom is the debut album by Mystic, released on June 19, 2001 through GoodVibe Recordings and JCOR Entertainment. The album elicited highly positive reviews from critics, who praised the album's lyrics and themes, but the album was less successful commercially, peaking at number 170 on the Billboard Hot 200. The album was re-released in 2011 by Universal Music Group.

Background
Before recording as a solo artist, Mystic toured with Digital Underground. She was then offered a record deal, but the same day she signed the contract, her father overdosed and died. She wrote the song "Fatherless Child" in memory of him.

Writing and recording
Mystic wrote the song "Fatherless Child" about her childhood, growing up without a father. When recording the song in studio, she brought in his ashes and set them on a makeshift altar. She told Vibe in a 2003 interview that the reaction to the song was enormous, with teenagers e-mailing her to tell her about how distant their fathers were and the lengths some went to get their attention, going so far as to attempt suicide.

Critical reception
The album was met with generally favorable reviews upon its release. AllMusic awarded the album 4 stars and noted the album's diversity of musical styles, also praising her "socially relevant and personally revealing topic matter." Entertainment Weekly awarded the album an "A" and called the songs "catchy but meaningful."

Release
The album was initially released by GoodVibe Records on June 19, 2001. the release was problematic, with distribution problems, but the rights to the album were acquired by Dreamworks Records. The label intended to re-release the album with five new songs, but Interscope Records consumed the label and all plans of re-releasing the album were shelved. On August 2, 2011, the album was re-released by Universal Music Group, to celebrate the album's tenth anniversary.

Commercial performance
The album performed poorly in the United States, stalling out at number 170 on the Billboard 200 and failing to enter the top 40 of the Top R&B/Hip-Hop Albums chart, peaking at 46. However, lead single "The Life" proved a minor hit, spending three months on the Bubbling Under Hot R&B/Hip-Hop Singles chart, where it reached number 9. The album was more successful on some other charts, however. It peaked at number 3 on CMJ New Music Report's Hip-Hop airplay chart, and topped Billboard'''s Pacific Heatseekers chart.

Accolades
The album earned Mystic several accolades and award nominations. In 2001, Kludge'' magazine ranked it at number seven on their list of best albums of the year. In 2002, the album earned Mystic a nomination for "Best female hip-hop artist" at the BET Awards; she lost, however, to Missy Elliott. That same year, the album cut "W" was nominated for "Best Rap/Sung Collaboration," a new category, at the Grammy Awards; the song lost to Eve's "Let Me Blow Ya Mind," a collaboration with Gwen Stefani.

Track listing
"Intro" - 1:00 
"Ghetto Birds" - 5:27 
"Neptune's Jewels" - 4:45 
"The Gottas" - 5:35 
"The Life" - 3:48 
"Once a Week" - 3:37 
"Dave Ghetto" - 1:30 
"Forever and a Day" - 4:38 
"D Boy" - 3:48 
"You Say, I Say" - 4:51 
"A Dream" - 4:59 
"W" - 4:31 (featuring Planet Asia) 
"Fallen Angels" - 5:38 
"Girlfriend Sistagirl" - 3:57 
"Fatherless Child" - 5:44 
"OK....Alright" - 4:34 
"Spoken Peace" - 3:34 
"Destiny Complete" - 4:29

Charts

References

2001 debut albums
Interscope Records albums